Kate Plus Ten is a 1917 British crime novel written by Edgar Wallace. In 1938, it was made into a film Kate Plus Ten. It was adapted for the film The Trygon Factor starring Stewart Granger.

Plot
"What an enigma Kate Is!"

Attempts to capture eighteen-year-old criminal mastermind Kate Wasthanger, a colonel's niece and the strategist behind several increasingly successful swindles. These include stealing a complete and valuable railway goods train. "Each one is bigger than the last – but never once have we traced the crime to her door."

References

1917 British novels
British novels adapted into films
British crime novels
Novels by Edgar Wallace